Gretel Bueta (née Tippett; born 3 July 1993) is an Australian netball player and former basketball player.

Basketball
Bueta played for the Australian Institute of Sport in the Women's National Basketball League during the 2010/2011 season. She played half the season with the Logan Thunder in the 2011/2012 season and was named Rookie of the Year for WNBL in 2011 before pulling out due to glandular fever. She also played in 3 junior World Championships - 2009 U/19 World Championships in Thailand where Australia placed 5th. 2010 u/17 World Championships in France where Australia placed 7th and 2011 u/19 World Championships in Chile where Australia placed 4th. In a 24 November 2010 game for the team against the Canberra Capitals, she scored thirteen points and had ten rebounds.

Netball

In March 2012, Bueta made the switch from Basketball to Netball, registering as a goal attack, goal shooter

In 2013, she was used as a replacement player for the Queensland Firebirds for the injured Chelsea Pitman. Later that year, she was selected for the Australian under 21 netball team for the 2013 World Youth Netball Championship in Glasgow, Scotland, where Australia finished second, and announced that she was joining the NSW Swifts.

Bueta made her ANZ Championship debut in Round 5 of the 2014 ANZ Championship after signing with the NSW Swifts for the 2014 and 2015 seasons.

At the end of the 2014 season, she was released from her contract with the NSW Swifts a year early to return home to be closer to family, signing with the Queensland Firebirds for the 2015 and 2016 seasons. She was selected in the Australian Diamonds squad for the 2018/19 international season.

Gretel has been named in the Super Netball Team of the Year three times, in 2018, 2019 and the 2022 . In the latter year she was also awarded the Liz Ellis Diamond, the most prestigious annual award in Australian netball, given to the player judged the best in both domestic and international netball throughout the calendar year. She sat out of the entire 2020 season as a result of being pregnant with her first child.

Following a season on the sidelines, Gretel and her husband Niko have since welcomed their first child Bobby Bueta into the world. Bueta returned to netball in the 2021 season. Landing a spot in the top 15 current league shooters with 266 points at 80.5% accuracy. She continues to play in the 2022 Suncorp Super Netball season for the Queensland Firebirds. In which she was awarded the Most Valuable Player at the Queensland Firebirds awards night. She further proved her athleticism in the 2022 Netball Quad Series, having a standout performance of 93% shooting accuracy and earning player of the match.

National & International netball representation
 2013 Australian 21/U World Youth Netball Championship Team
 2014 Netball Centre of Excellence Program
 2014 ANZ Championship debut for the Queensland Firebirds
 2013 Australian Fast5 Netball Flyers 
 2013 Australian World Youth Netball Championship 
 2015 Constellation Cup 
 2016 Constellation Cup
 2017 Netball Quad Series - August/September
 2017 Australian Fast5 Netball Flyers
 2017 Constellation Cup 
 2018 Netball Quad Series - January
 2018 Netball Quad Series - September
 2018 Constellation Cup 
 2019 Netball Quad Series
 2019 Netball World Cup
 2019 Constellation Cup
 2021 Constellation Cup
 2022 Netball Quad Series
 2022 Commonwealth Games Birmingham

Personal life
Bueta is the sister of former AFL footballers Kurt and Joel, and the only daughter of Tony and Janet Tippet.
She married her long-term boyfriend, Niko Bueta, on the 7th of March 2020 and gave birth to the couple's first child, Bobby Bueta in January 2021.  Bueta announced her second pregnancy in October 2022 and her withdrawal from the Constellation Cup series against the Silver Ferns. She miscarried and was unknown if she was going to play the 2023 season but in January 2023, she announced that she is having her rainbow baby (2nd pregnancy) and will miss the 2023 SSN season and world cup in Cape Town.

References

Australian Institute of Sport basketball (WNBL) players
1993 births
New South Wales Swifts players
Queensland Firebirds players
Sportspeople from the Gold Coast, Queensland
Sportswomen from Queensland
Living people
2019 Netball World Cup players
Netball players at the 2022 Commonwealth Games
Commonwealth Games gold medallists for Australia
Commonwealth Games medallists in netball
Suncorp Super Netball players
Netball players from Queensland
Queensland Fusion players
Australian Netball League players
Australian netball players
Australia international netball players
Australia international Fast5 players
Queensland state netball league players
Medallists at the 2022 Commonwealth Games